The Orinoco Mining Arc (OMA), officially created on 24 February 2016 as the "Arco Mining Orinoco National Strategic Development Zone", is an area rich in mineral resources that Venezuela has been operating since 2017; It has 7,000 tons of reserves of gold, copper, diamond, coltan, iron, bauxite, and other minerals. The Orinoco Mining Arc covers an area of 111,843 km2, 12.2 % of the Venezuelan territory and doubling that of the Orinoco Belt. According to former minister Roberto Mirabal, the Mining Arc has a potential mineral value of $2 trillion US dollars.

The Academy of Physical, Mathematical and Natural Sciences, the Venezuelan Society of Ecology, the Association of Archaeologists and Archaeologists of Venezuela (AAAV), the National Assembly of Venezuela and the NGO PROVEA have publicly expressed their concern at the non-compliance with environmental and sociocultural impact studies, the violation of rights to prior consultation with indigenous communities, cultural and natural heritage, and national sovereignty.

In 2020, the United Nations High Commissioner for Human Rights, Michelle Bachelet, denounced that workers in the Orinoco Mining Arc are subjected to serious abuse and violence that caused at least 149 deaths between 2016 and 2020.

Current Situation 
The creation of the Orinoco Mining Arc immediately triggered a migration of groups identified and anonymous with the sole objective of obtaining and taking possession of minerals (gold, coltan, diamonds, etc.) for profit.

Thus, according to an article by OEG, RAISG reports that the Mining Arc has made Venezuela the Amazon country with the highest number of illegal mines.  According to the organization SOS Orinoco, in the last 20 years, 779,600 hectares of forest have been destroyed.  In fact, mining is so critical in Canaima National Park (Unesco site), that Unesco's World Heritage Centre emitted a resolution that was approved without discussion or amendments on July 23, 2021 to further review impact of mining in this national park.

Per the Embassy of Canada in Venezuela, in Canaima alone, there are at least 59 illegal mines, some of them are only 23 km from Angel Falls, and the devastation of large areas continues due to open-pit mining operations.

Indigenous Communities Affected 
"Illegal mining also affects the enjoyment of the individual and collective rights of indigenous people, due to the destruction of their habitat and the lack of control over their traditional territories and natural resources" as reported by United Nations Human Rights Office of the High Commissioner.

According to the Center for Strategic & International Studies (CSIS), "mining has also been reported in the Alto Orinoco-Casiquiare Biosphere Reserve, a protected area that is home to the Yanomami people and other indigenous people. Though Southern Venezuela is home to 34 indigenous communities who have long been involved in environmental preservation, they were not consulted before the Maduro regime implemented public policies to promote mining in the region".  This same source adds that "approximately 500,000 workers are involved in illegal mining operations, many of them from local indigenous communities who have been coerced into working through threats of violence or due to economic necessity. These miners mostly are impoverished Venezuelans, and an estimated 45 percent are underage". "Indigenous communities who have attempted to resist illegal mining have been violently repressed or forced to flee their ancestral homes".

Moreover, per CSIS, as mercury from mining has seeped into the soil and water systems, local indigenous populations have been exposed at dangerous levels. In the Caura river basin, a tributary to the Orinoco, 92 percent of indigenous women had elevated levels of mercury, which could damage the kidney and brain and impedes fetal development.

According to Amazonia SocioAmbiental, "Arco Minero extends into the territories of ten indigenous communities in Venezuela".   Cultural Survival, using information from the International Commission of Jurists (ICJ), also addresses the impact on the different communities and says "the project is located south of the Orinoco River and is located on the homelands of several Indigenous Peoples, specifically the Kari’ña, Warao, Arawak, Pemón, Ye’kwana, Sanemá o Hotï, Eñe’pa, Panare, Wánai, Mapoyo, Piaroa and Hiwi."

See also 
 Deforestation of the Amazon rainforest
 Environmental issues in Venezuela
 El Palito oil spill
 Orinoco Belt
 Mining in Venezuela

References

External links 
 Arco Minero del Orinoco

 Planta de Procesamiento de Oro Sarrapia

Environmental impact of mining
Mining in Venezuela
Delta Amacuro
Bolívar (state)
Amazonas (Venezuelan state)
Orinoco basin
Environmental disasters in South America
Environment of Venezuela